Ivan Haralampiev is a Bulgarian linguist, mediaeval.

He graduated with a degree in Bulgarian Philology from the Veliko Tarnovo University ″St. Cyril and St. Methodius″ in 1973 and in 1999 defended his professorship.

Rector of Veliko Tarnovo University.

Full member and full professor of the Public Academy on Security, Defense and Legal Issues in Moscow. Awarded with the Russian Order ″Lomonosov″.

One of the best specialists and scholars in the world in the history and periodization of the Bulgarian literary language. There are over 150 scientific publications, of which 12 books, textbooks and teaching aids.

Sources 

Bulgarian philologists
Linguists from Bulgaria
Cyrillo-Methodian studies
People from Kyustendil
1946 births
Living people